La Cueta is a locality located in the municipality of Cabrillanes, in León province, Castile and León, Spain. As of 2020, it has a population of 57.

Geography 
La Cueta is located 98km northwest of León, Spain.

References

Populated places in the Province of León